George Francis Barrett (November 17, 1907 – December 2, 1980) served as Illinois Attorney General from 1941 to 1949.

Biography
George F. Barrett, Jr. hailed from a prominent Chicago family.  His father George F. Barrett, Sr. was chief justice of the Cook County (IL) Circuit Court.

References

Lawyers from Chicago
Illinois Attorneys General
Illinois Republicans
1907 births
1980 deaths
20th-century American lawyers
20th-century American politicians